Kalosha is a genus of foraminifera included in the miliolid family Spiroloculinidae. Its test is small, ovate in outline, only  up to 0.2 mm in the greatest dimension; begins with an oval proloculus followed by planispirally coiled elongate tubular chambers one-half coil in length, forming three to five whorls. The wall is calcareous, hyaline (glassy), and imperforate. The aperture is a narrow slit at the end of the final chamber.

Kalosha was named by Boltovskoy, the type species is Kalosha oceanica Boltovskoy, 1978.  It has been found in Lower Pliocene sediments from the South Atlantic, Pacific, and Indian oceans.

References 

 Kalosha in list spiroloculinid genera; Loeblich & Tappan, 1988. Foraminiferal genera and their classification.

Tubothalamea
Foraminifera genera